The 2002 NCAA Women's Division I Swimming and Diving Championships were contested at the 21st annual NCAA-sanctioned swim meet to determine the team and individual national champions of Division I women's collegiate swimming and diving in the United States. 

This year's events were hosted by the University of Texas at the Lee and Joe Jamail Texas Swimming Center in Austin, Texas. 

Auburn topped the team standings for the first time, finishing 58 points ahead of three-time defending champions Georgia. It was the Tigers' first and the first for coach David Marsh.

Team standings
Note: Top 10 only
(H) = Hosts
(DC) = Defending champions
Full results

See also
List of college swimming and diving teams

References

NCAA Division I Swimming And Diving Championships
NCAA Division I Swimming And Diving Championships
NCAA Division I Women's Swimming and Diving Championships